Ildikó Zirighné Sós  (born 27 December 1976) is a Hungarian female water polo player. She was a member of the Hungary women's national water polo team, playing as a goalkeeper.

She was a part of the  team at the 2004 Summer Olympics and 2008 Summer Olympics. On club level she played for OSC Budapest in Hungary.

See also
 Hungary women's Olympic water polo team records and statistics
 List of women's Olympic water polo tournament goalkeepers
 List of World Aquatics Championships medalists in water polo

References

External links
 

1976 births
Living people
People from Tatabánya
Hungarian female water polo players
Water polo goalkeepers
Olympic water polo players of Hungary
Water polo players at the 2004 Summer Olympics
Water polo players at the 2008 Summer Olympics
Sportspeople from Komárom-Esztergom County
20th-century Hungarian women
21st-century Hungarian women